Gustavo Kuerten won in the final 6–1, 6–3 against José Acasuso.

Seeds

  Gustavo Kuerten (champion)
  Franco Squillari (quarterfinals)
  Marcelo Ríos (first round)
  Gastón Gaudio (semifinals)
  Fernando Vicente (semifinals)
  Francisco Clavet (first round)
  Hicham Arazi (first round)
  Álex Calatrava (first round)

Draw

Finals

Top half

Bottom half

External links
 2001 ATP Buenos Aires Singles draw

ATP Buenos Aires
2001 ATP Tour
ATP